Ellerau is a municipality in the Kreis (district) of Segeberg in Schleswig-Holstein, north Germany. It is situated some 24 km north of Hamburg, and 8 km northwest of Norderstedt.

References

Segeberg